Tushar Patel (born 1978) is a male wheelchair athlete from the United Kingdom. After contacting polio at an early age, his legs were paralyzed.

Tushar Patel is celebrated by a portrait, photographed by Michael Birt, in the National Portrait Gallery in London.

Achievements

References

Year of birth uncertain
1970s births
Living people
British male wheelchair racers
People with paraplegia
21st-century British people